Roger I of Tosny or Roger of Hispania (died c. 1040) was a Norman nobleman of the House of Tosny who took part in the Reconquista of Iberia.

Career
Roger was the son of Raoul I of Tosny, seigneur de Conches. In 1013, Roger and his father Raoul guarded the castle at Tillières for Richard II, Duke of Normandy.  A few years later, for an unknown reason, the pair were forced into exile and Tilliéres was taken from their custody (later given to Gilbert Crispin by Robert II).  While his father gained a reputation for himself in Apulia, Roger did the same in fighting the Muslims in Iberia.  The small Christian states of Northern Iberia welcomed volunteers and adventurers who they could use to mount a strong force for the Reconquista.  Roger was summoned by Ermesinde of Carcassonne, regent-countess of Barcelona after the death of her husband Ramon Borrell, to help her against the Muslim threat to her power.  Roger rushed to help, marrying Ermesende's daughter, terrorising the Saracens and capturing several towns and castles.  Adémar de Chabannes gives an echo of the more or less legendary deeds of Roger in Iberia.  He gained the nickname Mangeur de Maures (Moor-Eater). Adémar recounts that Roger took his captured Saracens each day and, in front of them, cut one of their number in two, boiling the first half and giving it to the other Muslims to eat, and pretending to take the other half into his own tent for him and his companions to eat.  Then Roger allowed some of these prisoners to escape, to spread these horrific rumours.

Before 1024, Roger and his father gained permission from Richard II to return to Normandy, and Raoul died soon afterwards.

Roger de Tosny founded Conches-en-Ouche. He built its church of  Sainte-Foy (before 1026) then the abbey of Saint-Pierre de Castillon (c. 1035) where monks from Fécamp Abbey were installed. This monastery was one of the first baronial foundations in Normandy  The foundation charter reveals that the lord of Tosny gave it a small possession around Conches and his forest.

In 1035, Robert I's death began a troubled period in the duchy of Normandy.  Civil wars multiplied and Roger (whose relations with his neighbours was already argumentative) was one of the main players in them.  According to the Norman chroniclers, the lord of Tosny refused to serve the new duke, William II, because he was of illegitimate birth.  He especially took advantage of the weakness of the duke's power by ravaging his neighbours' lands, notably those of Humphrey of Vieilles.  Humphrey sent his son Roger to face Roger of Tosny, and around 1040 the latter was killed in battle, and his two eldest sons died a few weeks later of their wounds.

Peace was re-established between the Tosny family and the neighbouring families.  The widow Gotelina/Godehildis was forced to marry Richard, Count of Évreux.

Family and descendants
Only one wife of Roger of Tosny is known by name, his widow, Adelaide (or Godehildis), who married Richard, Count of Évreux after Roger's death. It is unclear if she was his only wife.
Children:
Helbert of Tosny, died in 1040, with his father.
Helinand of Tosny, died in May 1039, in Conches.
Vuazo of Tosny
Raoul II of Tosny, successor of his father.
Robert of Tosny, Lord of Stafford
Béranger l'Espagnol of Tosny
Adelise of Tosny, married Guillaume Fils Osbern.
Berthe of Tosny, married Guy de Laval.

References

Bibliography

 Cokayne, G.E., The complete peerage; or, A history of the House of lords and all its members from the earliest times, ed. Geoffrey H. White, Vol. XII/1 (London: The St. Catherine Press, Ltd., 1953) 
 Douglas, David C., William the Conqueror (Berkeley; Los Angeles, The University of California Press, 1964)
 Lucien Musset, « Aux origines d'une classe dirigeante : les Tosny, grands barons normands du Xe au XIIe siècle », Sonderdruck aus Francia Forschungen zur westeuropäischen Geschichte, Munich, 1978, pp. 45–80
Lucas Villegas-Aristizabal, "Algunas notas sobre la participación de Rogelio de Tosny en la Reconquista Ibérica", Estudios Humanísticos de la Universidad de Leon, III, 2004, pp. 263–74. http://dialnet.unirioja.es/servlet/articulo?codigo=1078914
Lucas Villegas-Aristizabal, "Roger of Tosny's adventures in the County of Barcelona", Nottingham Medieval Studies LII, 2008, pp. 5–16. https://www.brepolsonline.net/doi/abs/10.1484/J.NMS.3.426
 Schwennicke, Detlev, Europäische Stammtafeln: Stammtafeln zur Geschichte der Europäischen Staaten, Neue Folge, Band II (Marburg, Germany:  J. A. Stargardt, 1984)
The Normans in Europe, ed. & trans., Elisabeth van Houts (Manchester: Manchester University Press, 2000) (Also see online extracts on Google Books)

11th-century Normans
11th-century deaths
Norman warriors
People of the Reconquista
1040 deaths
Year of birth unknown
Year of death uncertain